Rmeish is located in the District of Bint Jbeil, Lebanon near the Lebanese-Israeli border covering an area of . The ruins found in the village indicate that the area was occupied by the Romans and the Crusaders at some stage in history.

Origin of the name
The name Rmiesh means "scanty herbage" according to according E. H. Palmer.

Families
The first families to live in Rmeish came from the areas of Kesourwan especially from the Khazen and Chidiac families. At the same time some other Christian families moved to the village after the Shiite family Al Asaad offered them protection.

The main families in Rmeish are:

History
In 1299, Rmeish was directly under Mamluk rule.

Ottoman era
Rmeish was  under Ottoman rule until 1920.
Rmeish was involved in many wars and battles through the history. The most important ones are:

 In 1797, the viceroy of Acre Ahmad Pasha EL Jazar demolished and destroyed the village including the only church that was there. His reasons for that were that Rmeish supported Prince Bashir El Chahabi against him, they helped Napoleon in his battle against Acre and that he was afraid, that Rmeish being the only Christian village in the area, might encourage other Christian villages to rebel against him.
Ahmad Basha burned down the church including all the records that were kept inside. The people of Rmeish refused to go back to their village until Ahmad Basha died in 1804 when they went back and rebuilt their church and village.
 In 1824, the leader of Rmeish Youssef Daher El Choufani led the village to a victory over the viceroy of Acre Abdallah El Darnadli.
 In 1829, Rmeish supported Prince Bashir El Chahabi in his battle against Sanour.
 Rmaich was hit by an earthquake in January 1837, which devastated the South all the way to Safad and Tiberias. Most of the homes were crushed, and around 30 people were killed, and more lives would have been lost if they had not been at evening prayers at the church, which was low and compact and did not collapse
 In 1839, Rmeish fought side by side with the Shiite of the neighbouring villages against the Egyptian army which ended by the withdrawal of the Egyptian army after suffering heavy losses.
 In 1840, Daher El Choufani led Rmeish in another battle against the Egyptian army.

When the Ottoman Empire entered the war, they forced everyone between 18 and 60 years to fight in the Turkish army. People from Rmeish were forced to fight in Bulgaria, Istanbul and the Suez Canal in Egypt.
Between 20 and 30 never came back from the war and no one knew anything about them till today.

In 1875 Victor Guérin found Rmaich to be inhabited by 500 Maronites, all impoverished. He observed that although the village appears to be relatively new—and according to its elders, it hasn't reached its hundred-year and five mark yet—it is located on the site of an earlier settlement.

In 1881, the PEF's Survey of Western Palestine (SWP)  described Rumeish: "A stone and mud village, containing about 500 Christians ; there is a Christian church; it is situated in the plain, with two large birkets and cisterns, surrounded by arable land and having some vineyards."

1916 Famine

A glittering cloud of locusts so large it blocked out the sun as it approached descended upon the farms destroying all wheat crops and stripping the prairie bare of all vegetation.
The famine decreased the number of the people living in Rmeish to about 450.

Lebanon
A petition was sent by all villages in south Lebanon to the Reconciliation Conference in Paris in 1919 asking for Rmeish and other villages to be included within Lebanon. The following is the petition:

"We call on the agreement and unanimity we, the residents of Tyre district of Shiites and Christians of forty thousands to be included in the State of Greater Lebanon for the following reasons: First, the Shiites of us are people form Sidon, Tyre, Marjayoun, El Rihan, Eklim El Kharoub and Hermel who truly want to join their nation. Second, Christians of us are of Lebanese origin and their ancestors came from the north to south. To the day they are relatives and want to join them."

In 1920, Ain Ebel was attacked by hundreds of Muslim militias. The leaders of Ain Ebel and Rmeish agreed to fight side by side against the attackers. The attackers attacked in large numbers that the defenders could not resist the attack and were forced to leave the villages to Palestine.

In 1920, Rmeish was included in what was known as the State of Greater Lebanon.

The Calamity of 1948

Rmeish hosted in their homes and their church between 1000 and 1500 Palestinians refugees displaces by the bloody events that took place between Palestinians and Jews.

Once they realised that going back to their country is not going to happen in the near future, Palestinians started to leave Rmeish at the start of 1951 heading to Beirut and other parts of Lebanon.

The Deportation of 1985

In 1985, the residents of east Saida were deported toward the south. 120 families were deported to Rmeish. Half of these families were to leave Rmeish within the next 2 months and the others stayed and lived in Rmeish until this day.

Emigration in the 20th century

At the start of the 20th century Rmeish knew emigration on a large scale to South America especially to Argentina and Brazil because of the high taxes imposed by the Ottoman Empire.
It is believed that around 100 left to Argentina between 1905 and 1914.

Schools
The first school was opened in 1870 by The Jesuits but was closed in 1900 to reopen in 1920 to close again 1949.

From 1949 till 1955, the Pontifical mission opened a school for the Palestinians refugees.

From 1945, Rmeich Supplementary School was opened which closed down in 1992.

Our Lady of Lebanon School was opened in 1959.

In 1974 Rmeich high school was opened.

Churches

Saint George church

Was originally built around 1700, to later destroyed in 1787 and then to be rebuilt in 1806. The church was Cohesive and strong therefore it survived the 1837 earthquake that destroyed the village. Between 1925 and 1929 it was knocked down and then rebuilt on a larger land.

Church of Transfiguration

In the 1970s, because of the rapid grow of the number of people living in Rmeich, and the impossible mission of expanding the saint George church, the people of Rmeich decided to build a new church. The work did not start until 1982 to finish only at the start of 2000.

Lady of the Annunciation Monastery

The building of the monastery was approved in 1983. By 1986 it was finished to be the first maronite monastery in south Lebanon.

Red Cross

The red cross centre opened in 1968 to provide medical assistance to the people of the area. The centre was built in Rmeich because of its position halfway between the other 2 hospitals in the region. All the members in this centre are volunteers.

Politics

Municipal Council

A number of rich and powerful personnel took the responsibility of managing the affairs of Rmeich and its people.

Municipal Elections

The Municipal election was held for the first time in 1961. It was based on an alliance of the majority of the main families against another alliance of the minority of the same families. Few hours before the elections, the two alliances meet and agreed on a head of the municipality council and a representation of all the families in the council. On that basis the first election was held in the village.

This council was behind a lot of projects, the most important are:

 The establishment of the electrical system in 1964
 The establishment of the water system in 1964
 Paving the roads in 1965
 Buying 1000 m2 to build a high school

Parliamentary Elections

These elections reflected the agreement or disagreement of families. Usually the village has been split between supporters and opposition to the deputy or another; however they agreed once to vote for the same deputy.

Local Administration 1975–1992

The local administration is a committee comprising representatives of all the families in the village. The Local Administration handled the municipal council and the mayor duties because of the events that happened at that time.

Natural disasters

Rmeich suffered from many natural disasters, the most significant one was the earthquake of 1837 when an earthquake hit the village killing 35. The rest of the people were praying in the church that day and therefore were protected by the strong building of the church.

Rmeich was hit by few other earthquakes in 1887, 1888 and 1927 which caused the destruction of many houses without any casualties.

Tobacco

Planting tobacco started in Rmeich halfway through the 18th century due to several natural factors: vast agricultural land, availability of irrigation water and farmers.

In 1883, the Ottoman government granted the right to monopolize the tobacco to the Regie Company. Rmeich residents did not abide by this resolution, which prompted the government to send a detachment of the army to end this situation. It ended after 8 days by the people of Rmeich agreeing on the decision.

Ruins

Around Rmeich there are few mountains that were occupied by different people through the history, which still have some remains today. The people who lived in these mountains are the Romans and Muslims. The most important mountains are:

Katamoun The Romans lived in Katamoun around 2,000 years ago and transformed it to a military post where they built a fortress to protect their country. Until today some remains of the fortress can still be seen in the form of a 50mx50m fence.

Koura was occupied by the Romans and the Muslims who stayed there until the end of 1838 when they left because of an earthquake that hit the area. The ruins in that mountain are still standing till today.

Some other ruins in the form of old cemeteries found in different parts of the village which are believed to go back to the 4th century BC.

References

Bibliography

External links
Survey of Western Palestine, Map 4: IAA, Wikimedia commons
Rmaych,  Localiban
www.rmeish.net
www.geni.com/family-tree/index/6000000005414356925 Rmeich family tree 'all families'

Populated places in the Israeli security zone 1985–2000
Populated places in Bint Jbeil District